Murray Hill is a New York City comedian and drag king entertainer. He is the entertainer persona of Busby Murray Gallagher, although this persona is maintained even in private settings. Murray Hill is the self-proclaimed "hardest-working middle-aged man in show business".

In The Encyclopedia of Lesbian and Gay Histories and Cultures, Jack Halberstam praised Hill for "transforming masculinity and exposing its theatricality with profound results". The New York Times called him "the current reigning patriarch of the downtown performance community" and the Seattle Weekly called him a "pioneer" of drag kings.

Biography
Hill started performing in 1995, when the East Village's cutting-edge chic waned as the neighborhood gentrified, the art galleries moved for cheaper rent in Chelsea, and the music scene shifted to the Pacific Northwest. His famous impersonations include Elvis and John Travolta. Hill was part of a 1990s wave of comedians and performers whose talent stood out in the Lower East Side and East Village scene, emblematic of the neighborhood as portrayed in the musical Rent.

Hill is a frequent emcee in Lower Manhattan of such events as the annual "Ms. Lez" competition, a bingo night with co-host drag queen Linda Simpson, and a variety of burlesque and theater performances.

Hill was the opening act for a tour of the rock band Le Tigre and has opened for The Gossip. He has performed at parties given by Joan Rivers, Ivana Trump, and Liza Minnelli; and his acts incorporate homages to Joey Adams, Benny Hill, Sammy Davis Jr., and Henny Youngman.

Hill had cameos in John Cameron Mitchell's 2006 film, Shortbus, and in HBO's Bored to Death.  He also appears in Dirty Martini and the New Burlesque, a film about NYC's burlesque scene with a focus on performer Dirty Martini.  Hill and Michael Musto appeared in the video for TV on the Radio's song "No Future Shock."

As of February, 2022, Hill is a supporting cast member in Hulu's Life & Beth and in the HBO Series, Somebody, Somewhere.

Hill is transgender.

Gallery

See also
 LGBT culture in New York City
 List of LGBT people from New York City

References

External links

Murray Hill's official website
Murray Hill's profile in Gothamist
Murray Hill guest starred on episodes 10 and 20 of Radio Happy Hour
Murray Hill on the life and versatility of a New York drag king from WikiNews
Murray Hill on the performance scene in New York, from Queery

American drag kings
Culture of New York City
American LGBT artists
Comedians from New York City
American performance artists
American neo-burlesque performers
Year of birth missing (living people)
Living people
Transgender artists
Transgender men
Transgender drag performers